The 2015–16 NBL season was the 38th season of competition since its establishment in 1979. A total of eight teams contested the league. The regular season was played between 7 October 2015 and 14 February 2016, followed by a post-season featuring the top four in late February and March 2016.

During the off-season the Wollongong Hawks reverted to their original name Illawarra Hawks which was last used in 1998.

Australian broadcast rights to the season are held by Fox Sports, in the first year of a five-year deal, with one game per week simulcast on the Nine Network. In New Zealand Sky Sport are the official league broadcaster.

Pre-season

2015 NBL Pre-Season Blitz 
A pre-season tournament featuring all eight teams was held on 24–27 September 2015 at Townsville RSL Stadium, Townsville. The winner will receive the third annual Loggins-Bruton Cup.

Melbourne United are pre-season champions.

Regular season

Round 1

Round 2

Round 3

Round 4

Round 5

Round 6

Round 7

Round 8

Round 9

Round 10

Round 11

Round 12

Round 13

Round 14

Round 15

Round 16

Round 17

Round 18

Round 19

Ladder

The NBL tie-breaker system as outlined in the NBL Rules and Regulations states that in the case of an identical win–loss record, the results in games played between the teams will determine order of seeding.

1Melbourne United won Head-to-Head (3-1).

Finals 

The 2015–16 National Basketball League Finals were played in late February and March 2016, consisting of two best-of-three semi-final and final series, where the higher seed hosts the first and third games.

Playoff Seedings 

 Melbourne United
 Perth Wildcats
 Illawarra Hawks
 New Zealand Breakers

The NBL tie-breaker system as outlined in the NBL Rules and Regulations states that in the case of an identical win–loss record, the results in games played between the teams will determine order of seeding.

Playoff bracket

Semi-finals

Grand final

Awards

Player of the Month

Coach of the Month

Pre-season
 Most Valuable Player (Ray Borner Medal): Stephen Holt, Melbourne United & Markel Starks, Cairns Taipans

Season
 Most Valuable Player (Andrew Gaze Trophy): Kevin Lisch, Illawarra Hawks
 Rookie of the Year: Nick Kay, Townsville Crocodiles
 Best Defensive Player: Kevin Lisch, Illawarra Hawks
 Best Sixth Man: Hakim Warrick, Melbourne United
 Most Improved Player: Clint Steindl, Townsville Crocodiles
 Coach of the Year (Lindsay Gaze Trophy): Shawn Dennis, Townsville Crocodiles
 Referee of the Year: Vaughan Mayberry
 All-NBL First Team:
 Jerome Randle – Adelaide 36ers
 Kevin Lisch – Illawarra Hawks
 Chris Goulding – Melbourne United
 Daniel Kickert – Melbourne United
 Andrew Ogilvy – Illawarra Hawks
 All-NBL Second Team:
 Stephen Holt – Melbourne United
 Corey Webster – New Zealand Breakers
 Kirk Penney – Illawarra Hawks
 Matthew Knight – Perth Wildcats
 Daniel Johnson – Adelaide 36ers

Finals
 Grand Final Series MVP (Larry Sengstock Medal): Damian Martin, Perth Wildcats

References

 
Australia,NBL
2015–16 in Australian basketball
2015 in New Zealand basketball
2016 in New Zealand basketball